To Write Love on Her Arms (TWLOHA) is an American nonprofit organization that aims to present hope for people struggling with addiction, depression, self-injury and thoughts of suicide, while also investing in treatment and recovery. Based in Melbourne, Florida, TWLOHA seeks to connect people to treatment centers, websites, books, support groups, helplines, and other resources. TWLOHA also encourages people to have honest conversations about mental health, and to live in community.

The organization's name is a direct reference to the first person the organization helped to receive treatment for addiction and self-harm, a young addict who self-harmed by cutting the words "Fuck Up" on her arm with a razor blade. The group's founder and a group of friends stayed with her in order to "be her church, the body of Christ coming alive to meet her needs, to write love on her arms".

Much of TWLOHA's work is dedicated to bridging the gap between mental health treatment (e.g., rehab, counseling, helplines) and the lives of people in need of help. The organization meets and interacts with people at music festivals, schools and universities, and through social media. Aiming to support existing professional help organizations rather than replace them, TWLOHA has invested in causes such as Hopeline, InTheRooms.com, S.A.F.E. Alternatives, Minding Your Mind, and (in Australia) Kids Helpline.

The group's initial exposure came from musicians and bands wearing the organization's T-shirts in photographs and during live performances, but it has recently gained more exposure through merchandise and social media websites such as Facebook, MySpace, Twitter, and Tumblr.

History

TWLOHA was founded by Jamie Tworkowski in March 2006. The seeds of the organization were sown by a story written by Tworkowski, about 19-year-old Renee Yohe, who struggled with addiction, depression, self-injury, and attempted suicide.  Tworkowski's story, written in February 2006, chronicles Yohe's life five days before she entered treatment. Unable to get Yohe immediately checked into a treatment, a group of friends, including Tworkowski, stayed with Yohe and offered moral support.

TWLOHA began operating as a non-profit organization in October 2006 under the umbrella of Fireproof Ministries.  On April 30, 2010, TWLOHA left Fireproof and TWLOHA, Inc. was established in Florida as a 501(c)(3) non-profit organization. The TWLOHA team is made up of under 20 full-time staff members and a rotating group of interns. The organization's offices were originally stationed in Cocoa, Florida, until 2011 when they moved to downtown Melbourne.

In addition to the story, T-shirts were printed and sold in Orlando to fund Yohe's treatment, and a Myspace page was created to serve as home-base for the project. Bands such as Anberlin and Switchfoot showed their support and began wearing TWLOHA T-shirts, and the TWLOHA MySpace and Facebook pages began to receive messages and comments from young people struggling with the same issues that Yohe had faced. What began as an attempt to help one person in Orlando quickly generated wide interest – to date, TWLOHA has responded to over 200,000 messages from over 100 countries and invested over $2,200,000 directly into treatment and recovery.

On the FAQ of TWLOHA's official website, it is stated that Yohe has completed rehab and will have to fight her addiction for the rest of her life. Yohe published a collection of journals in a book titled "Purpose for the Pain". Yohe's story, and the organization's story, has also been turned to a major motion picture titled To Write Love on Her Arms. Yohe was portrayed by actress Kat Dennings, and Chad Michael Murray portrayed Tworkowski. Actors Corbin Bleu and Rupert Friend also starred in the film.

Supporters have said September 10–17 is "TWLOHA Week" and many write "LOVE" on their arms during that week, sharing the stories of hope with others. However, there are some regions that observe this day on November 13. The organization addressed this event and clarified that it was something they did not create, but appreciated their supporters taking on such an active interest in promoting the movement.

Celebrity endorsements
TWLOHA has risen to prominence through endorsements of celebrities and bands, often seen wearing TWLOHA T-shirts during concerts and events. Jon Foreman of the band Switchfoot was reportedly the first person to wear one of the T-shirts on stage.

Professional soccer players, including Abby Wambach, Alex Morgan, Ali Krieger, Ashlyn Harris and Christen Press, are often seen wearing TWLOHA apparel.

In March 2015, actor Jared Padalecki designed a T-shirt for TWLOHA. Actor Joaquin Phoenix has also shown support for the organization.

Musicians seen wearing TWLOHA apparel and mentioning TWLOHA include: Anthony Raneri of Bayside, 5 Seconds of Summer, Miley Cyrus, Paramore, Boys Like Girls, OneRepublic, A Day to Remember, Panic! at the Disco, Nothing More, The Red Jumpsuit Apparatus, and many others. The band Between the Trees has written and performed two songs about Renee Yohe, "A Time For Yohe" and "The Way She Feels", while the band Skillet wrote and performed the song "The Last Night".

TWLOHA has been invited to set up booths on tour with several artists, including Switchfoot, Anberlin, The Rocket Summer, Blue October and others.

Campaigns and events 
Kevin Wu of KevJumba and JumbaFund created interest in this organization when he created JumbaFund, a YouTube channel where all proceeds go to a charity voted on by its viewers. Other YouTube celebrities such as SwiftKarateChop (Matthew Brian Brown) began supporting this organization.

TWLOHA cut all ties and funding to Mercy Ministries and Teen Challenge in 2008 after discovering their alleged mistreatment of patients. TWLOHA also addresses this on their FAQ section. TWLOHA actively supports diversity and the LGBTQ community. They participated in the "Wear Your Purple" Day and have promoted the It Gets Better Campaign.

In early 2009, TWLOHA partnered with Kristin Brooks Hope Center to create IMAlive. IMAlive is the first ever online crisis counseling over instant messenger staffed by people 100% trained and certified in crisis intervention. TWLOHA won $125,000 for IMAlive.

The TWLOHA Spring 2010 UChapters Tour, "Evenings of Lyrics and Conversation", featured music by Damion Suomi, Andy Zipf, and Lauris Vidal.

On April 5, 2011, Behind the Brand interviewed founder Jamie Tworkowski about the past, present, and future of TWLOHA.

In the summer of 2011 TWLOHA launched a new campaign titled "Fears vs. Dreams" which asks people two questions: "What is your biggest fear?" and "What is your greatest dream?".

In February 2012 TWLOHA's first ever high school campaign, "The Storytellers", launched. The campaign aimed to give high school students resources and support, and to bring awareness to importance of addressing mental health issues. The top fundraisers received a TWLOHA event at their school for no cost.

In January and February 2013, TWLOHA took its flagship event HEAVY AND LIGHT on the road to 17 cities across the U.S.

Awards and media coverage 
In August 2007, TWLOHA was awarded a MySpace Impact Award in the Community Building category.

On September 12, 2008, To Write Love on Her Arms was featured on the NBC Nightly News segment "Making a Difference".

At the end of 2009, organization founder Jamie Tworkowski received mtvU's Good Woodie Award, which is given to artists whose commitment to a social cause has "effected the greatest change this year."

On November 25, 2009, Rolling Stone magazine featured an article about TWLOHA.  On November 12, 2009, Jamie invited anyone in the NYC area to join in on the photoshoot in Washington Square Park. The photos were taken by Peter Yang, whose photo of then Presidential Candidate Barack Obama won "Cover of the Year" in 2008.  He later commented after the shoot that this was the largest group of subjects he had photographed to date.

In March 2010 TWLOHA won the Best Non-Profit Use of Twitter Award at the 2nd Annual Shorty Awards held in New York City.

In October 2010, TWLOHA was part of a piece on CBS Morning News about preventing "The Youngest Suicides".

On January 6, 2011, TWLOHA won the 2010 "Must-Follow Non-Profit" Award at the 4th Annual Mashable Awards.

In February 2011, for the second year in a row, TWLOHA was a finalist in the Shorty Awards.

As of January 12, 2011, TWLOHA had reached over 1,000,000 likes on their official Facebook page.

On October 6, 2011, Chase Bank announced the five finalists for the American Giving Awards in which the five finalists shared $2 million in grants. TWLOHA was one of those five and gained the most votes in Round 1 over any other organization.

On December 10, 2011, TWLOHA was awarded a $1,000,000 grant towards their mission on NBC's American Giving Awards.

Film

A film dramatization (formerly titled Day One and Renee) of Yohe's story that Tworkowski documented was released March 3, 2015, by Sony Pictures starring Kat Dennings as Yohe and Chad Michael Murray as Tworkowski.

References

External links
 Official website
 The Music Behind To Write Love On Her Arms

2006 establishments in Florida
Non-profit organizations based in Florida
Organizations established in 2006
Self-harm
Mental health support groups
Shorty Award winners